A traffic homicide investigator (THI) is a term used primarily in the United States of America for a police employee, generally a sworn law enforcement officer, who is assigned to investigate fatalities resulting from motor vehicle collisions.

Overview 
Traffic homicide investigators have special training that goes beyond standard accident investigation and equips them to conduct an investigation of the site of serious or fatal collisions and to treat them as crime scenes. They are usually traffic officers who have investigated a great number of nonfatal crashes and have advanced towards more in-depth crash investigation. Although they may not be the first responders to traffic-related fatalities, they will be called upon to take over the investigations at an early stage and see them through to their conclusions.

Method 
THIs are "part physicist, part policeman and part victim's advocate". They carefully document the scenes of crashes, ideally in a manner thorough enough to allow specially trained officers to reconstruct the scene at a later time, after the roadway has been reopened. This includes documenting the precise details of the roadway on which the fatality occurred; the state of any vehicles involved, including the use of safety features; the condition, legal status and attitude of the operator or operators of any vehicles, and any other local factors such as the weather and the presence or absence of appropriate road signage. 

In addition, investigators will conduct interviews with drivers and witnesses to assist in building up an overall picture of what led to the crash.

Around the world

United Kingdom 
In the United Kingdom, specialised collision investigators working as part of the local police force's traffic unit will usually handle collisions that result in death or serious injury. They receive training equivalent to this in the US and conduct their investigations with similar methodology.

See also
 Vehicular homicide
 Manslaughter
 Detective

References

Traffic law
Homicide
 
Law enforcement titles
Criminal investigation